The V H Group is an Indian conglomerate primarily comprising companies related to the poultry industry, including  processed food, animal vaccines, human and animal pharmaceutical and healthcare products.

It was founded as Venkateshwara Hatcheries Pvt Ltd in 1971 in Hyderabad, India and later shifted its base to Pune, India for want of favorable climatic conditions required for research of livestock. It has also built Balaji temple at Pune which is a replica of famous Balaji temple of Tirupati. It is also the owner of English football club Blackburn Rovers, overseeing two relegations and one promotion with the club. The company invested £130m for a vaccine plant in Switzerland and 150cr for a feedmill in Vietnam in  2010.

Group profile
The V H Group is controlled by the family of Dr. B. V. Rao. His daughter, Anuradha Desai, is serving as group chairperson since his death in 1996. His sons B Balaji Rao and Venkatesh Rao sit on the board of the group's companies.

The V H Group has its headquarters in Pune, and has offices in United Kingdom, Oman, Bangladesh, Vietnam, Italy. The Group has production plants in India, Vietnam, Bangladesh, United States and Switzerland, and exports to 35 countries across the world.

In December 2010, the group launched Venky's Xprs, a fast food restaurant specializing in chicken. The first outlet opened in Pune, India.

Sport

Blackburn Rovers
In November 2010, the group took over English Premier League club Blackburn Rovers FC, acquiring a 99.9% stake through a new holding company, Venky's London Ltd. The deal was worth £43 million including taking on around £20 million of the club's debt.

After sacking Sam Allardyce as the club's manager, Steve Kean was appointed in his place, raising media concern as Kean's agent Jerome Anderson had advised Venky's during its takeover of the club. Venky's oversaw an unsuccessful period resulting in relegation to the Championship after the 2011–12 Premier League season ending the club's 11-year run in the top flight, then a further relegation to the third-tier EFL League One after the 2016–17 season. Despite Kean leaving Blackburn Rovers in September 2012, criticism of Venky's running of the club has continued, with both fans and the media calling them into question. In September 2016, Venky's publicly stated their commitment to the club.

Businesses
The group includes:
 Venkateshwara Hatcheries Pvt. Ltd.
 Venky's (India) Limited
 
 VENCO Research and Breeding Farms Pvt. Ltd. 
 Venkateshwara Research and Breeding Farms Pvt. Ltd. 
 Venkateshwara B.V.Bio-Corp Pvt. Ltd.
 
 Uttara Foods & Feeds Pvt. Ltd.
 Uttara Impex Pvt. Ltd.
 Venky's Vietnam Ltd.
 Venky's Singapore Pvt. Ltd.
 VH Group Bangladesh
 Bala Industries & Entertainment Pvt. Ltd.

References

Agriculture companies of India
Food and drink companies of India
Companies based in Pune
Conglomerate companies established in 1971
Indian companies established in 1971
Poultry industry in India
Privately held companies of India
Food and drink companies established in 1971
1971 establishments in Maharashtra